Azara celastrina, also known as lilen, is a small tree in the family Salicaceae. It grows to a height of 10m and its native range is central Chile. The yellow flowers are in an axillary corymb, and the leaves are serrate, oval and alternate, with a length of 4cm. A. celastrina grows in semi-arid conditions up to 1000m elevation.

References

Salicaceae
Flora of Chile